Paul Annacone and John Fitzgerald were the defending champions but they competed with different partners that year, Annacone with Christo van Rensburg and Fitzgerald with Anders Järryd.

Annacone and van Rensburg lost in the first round to Jakob Hlasek and Eric Winogradsky.

Fitzgerald and Järryd won in the final 7–6, 6–4 against Hlasek and Winogradsky.

Seeds
Champion seeds are indicated in bold text while text in italics indicates the round in which those seeds were eliminated.

 John Fitzgerald /  Anders Järryd (champions)
 Rick Leach /  Jim Pugh (quarterfinals)
 Paul Annacone /  Christo van Rensburg (first round)
 Ken Flach /  Robert Seguso (first round)

Draw

External links
 1989 Paris Open Doubles draw
 

Doubles